The Ulakhan Fault is a left-lateral moving transform fault that runs along the boundary between two tectonic plates in northeast Asia, the North American Plate, and the Okhotsk Plate.  It runs from a triple junction in the Chersky Range in the west, to another triple junction with the Aleutian Trench and the Kuril Trench in the east. From the offset of dated geomorphological features, a slip rate of 5.3±1.3 mm per year has been measured, consistent with estimates from GPS constrained global plate models. The analysis of fault scarps along the fault zone in the Seymchan Basin suggests that the fault is characterised by occasional large (>7.5) earthquakes.

References

External links
 International Seismic-Volcanic Workshop on Kamchatkan-Aleutian Subduction Processes (KASP), Fourth Workshop, Petropavlovsk-Kamchatsky August 21-27, 2004

Plate tectonics
Seismic faults of Asia
Geology of the Russian Far East
Seismic faults of North America